The Wheatsheaf is a grade II listed public house in Heatherside, Camberley, Surrey. It was designed by John and Sylvia Reid and opened in 1970. It has a distinctive ratchet-wheel design and connects to the local shopping precinct.

History

The pub was designed by mass-market furniture designers John and Sylvia Reid, who were interested in experimental pub designs. and opened in May 1971 as part of a new housing estate. It was named after the wheatsheaf on the crest of Sir Henry Goldney whose family had connections with Camberley and previously owned the land before the estate was built. The original owners were First Eleven Limited, a London-based leisure business.

Architecture
The pub was designed by the Reids in response to changing social changes following World War II, where segregated bars in pubs were becoming rejected and unfashionable. It has a distinctive ratchet-wheel design covering a single-space bar area, and connects to the local shopping precinct. The interior features various triangular segments called "snugs" or "lounges" overlooking a central circular seating area with a central chimney. It was redesigned in 1989 to include additional space and a function room in what was previously a storage area.

It was listed grade II by Historic England in 2018. A representative from the National Heritage List for England said "the twisted roof looks like it has been thrown up by an unqualified builder" but commended the designers for the building's structural integrity.

References 

Buildings and structures completed in 1970
Grade II listed pubs in Surrey
Grade II listed buildings in Surrey
Camberley